Eupalamides preissi is a moth in the Castniidae family. It is found in Peru.

References

Moths described in 1899
Castniidae